James Shaw (12 January 1815 – 1 September 1881) was a Scottish painter, photographer, engraver, lithographer, surveyor, and lawyer. He was also an early colonist of South Australia.

Biography
Shaw was born on 12 January 1815 at Dumfries, Scotland to James and Isabella Shaw. His father was a clerk and proofreader who painted for pleasure.

Shaw went to Edinburgh Royal High School, and then studied law at the University of Edinburgh.

In September 1836, sponsored by Justice Thomas McCornock, he left Edinburgh for Jamaica to be a bookkeeper. He painted in his free time. When people realized his talent, they started to ask him for commissions. In 1841, he became a surveyor and began taking portrait commissions.

In 1847, Shaw learned photography and became a photographer.

He married Janet Liddle Paterson on 5 July 1850. Together, they moved to Adelaide in South Australia.

In 1857, he showed some of his paintings at the first exhibition of the South Australian Society of Arts, of which he was a founding member. He received an honorable mention. He continued to paint and exhibit his works until 1871.

Art
The Art Gallery of South Australia holds the major collection of his work.

Some of James Shaw's works from the 1860s:

1860 Lunatic Asylum, North Terrace (near cnr Hackney Rd)
1861 "Kingsford", a house near Gawler built by Stephen King sr
1864 All Saints Church, Hindmarsh
1865 Panoramic view of Adelaide from Montefiore Hill
1865 Inside Old Parliament House, The Chamber (later the Legislative Council)
1865 Woolwashing on the River Torrens at Hindmarsh
1866 Gawler Town, general view from the south

References

http://www.catalog.slsa.sa.gov.au/search~S1?/dShaw%2C+James%2C+1815-1881/dshaw+james+1815+1881/-3%2C-1%2C0%2CB/exact&FF=dshaw+james+1815+1881&1%2C7%2C
http://www.catalog.slsa.sa.gov.au/record=b2261504~S1 Campbell, Robert (n.d.) "Early South Australian artists", p. 16-17
http://www.catalog.slsa.sa.gov.au/record=b1255673~S1
Donoghoe, Margaret (1969) "James Shaw, 1815-1881 : topographical artist and early colonist of South Australia", Adelaide : Royal Geographical Society of Australasia, South Australian Branch
Reprinted with original page numbers, from Proceedings of the Royal Geographical Society of Australasia, South Australian Branch, Vol. 69 (1968)

1815 births
1881 deaths
Landscape artists
19th-century Australian artists
Artists from Adelaide